Santiago Nsobeya Efuman Nchama (c. 1950 – July 2020) was an Equatoguinean politician with the Democratic Party of Equatorial Guinea.

Between 1999 and 2003, he was Minister of Foreign Affairs, in which capacity he negotiated a marine borders agreement with Dubern Onya of Nigeria, which aimed to resolve disputes over offshore oil drilling. In April 2007, by which time he had become Information, Culture and Tourism Minister, he visited Zimbabwe and met with President Robert Mugabe.

In July 2013, Nsobeya was named Second Vice-President of the Chamber of Deputies of the Parliament of Equatorial Guinea, alongside Francisca Tatchouop Belobe. In January 2014, he was chosen as one of 24 Special Advisers of the Secretary-General of the Democratic Party of Equatorial Guinea. Since March 2014 until his death he was the First Vice-President of the Chamber of Deputies.

Nsobeya's death was reported on 8 July 2020, aged 70.

References

2020 deaths
1950 births
Democratic Party of Equatorial Guinea politicians
Foreign ministers of Equatorial Guinea
Government ministers of Equatorial Guinea
Members of the Chamber of Deputies (Equatorial Guinea)